

Events
 Nizami Ganjavi completes Eskandar Nameh, The Romance of Alexander the Great
 Peter of Blois resigns as Dean of St Peter's Collegiate Church

Births

Deaths
 Hammad al-Harrani (born unknown), Muslim scholar, poet, merchant and traveler
 Alain de Lille (born 1128), French theologian and poet, writing in Latin
 Eugenius of Palermo (born 1130), amiratus (admiral), translator, and poet
 Gaucelm Faidit (born 1170), Occitan troubadour (approx.)
 Jakuren (born 1139), Japanese Buddhist priest and poet

13th-century poetry
Poetry